Luisa Fernanda Valero Medina (born 5 April 1997) is a Colombian female badminton player.

Achievements

BWF International Challenge/Series
Women's Singles

 BWF International Challenge tournament
 BWF International Series tournament
 BWF Future Series tournament

References

External links
 

Living people
1997 births
Colombian female badminton players
21st-century Colombian women